The Salmon River, also known as "The River of No Return", is a river located in the U.S. state of Idaho in the western United States. The Salmon River is the longest undammed river in the contiguous United States and the longest within a single state outside Alaska.

Settlements located along the Salmon River include Stanley, Clayton, Challis, Salmon, Riggins, and White Bird. Redfish Lake and Little Redfish Lake, which flow into the river via Redfish Lake Creek, are the termini of the longest Pacific sockeye salmon migration in North America. The lower half of the river provides the time zone boundary for the state, with northern Idaho on Pacific Time and the rest of the state on Mountain Time.

Course
The Salmon River originates from and flows through the mountains of central and eastern Idaho (Lemhi Range, Sawtooth, Salmon River Mountains, Clearwater and Bitterroot Range). For the first , it flows north through the Sawtooth Valley, then turns east at Stanley, receiving the Yankee Fork shortly below that point and the East Fork further downstream. The river then flows northeast, receiving the Pahsimeroi River at Ellis and then the Lemhi River at Salmon, Idaho east of the Lemhi Range.

Here, the river is joined by its two largest tributaries, the Middle Fork and South Fork.  downstream (west) of its confluence with the Middle Fork, the Salmon River becomes the dividing line for the two time zones in Idaho: Mountain Time to the south, Pacific Time to the north, bisecting the state at approximately 45½ degrees north latitude.

From there the river flows almost due north, with U.S. Route 95 crossing the river on the "Time Zone Bridge" just north of Riggins, and then travels on its east bank until a few miles before White Bird. Excluding Alaska, the Salmon River is the longest river system contained entirely within a single U.S. state.

History

Anthropology
The Salmon River area has been home to people for at least the last 8,000 years. Much of the area was inhabited by several tribes, including the Nez Perce. The river was considered sacred ground and a rich source of food for the indigenous people of the area, who relied on the abundant salmon species and other wildlife.

Exploration

In August 1805, just after crossing the Continental Divide, Lewis and Clark ventured down the Salmon River, but found it to be too rough to be navigable. Clark wrote:

 ... I shall in justice to Capt. Lewis who was the first white man ever on this fork of the Columbia Call this Louis's river. ... The Westerly fork of the Columbia River [the present Salmon River] is double the size of the Easterley fork [the present Lemhi River] & below those forks the river is ...  wide, it is very rapid & Sholey water Clear but little timber.

The honor didn't last long; by 1810, maps of the area were already referring to "Louis' River" as the Salmon. Clark had thought that the Salmon River was the Snake River, thus he called it the "Westerly fork of the Columbia". The Snake River retained the variant name "Lewis River" or "Lewis Fork" longer than did the Salmon.

In the Early to Mid 20th Century other explorers arrived to the Salmon River and ultimately stayed. These early explorers included Frank Lance, Francis, Hank the Hermit, and most well know and storied Buckskin Bill.   Sylvan Ambrose Hart (Buckskin Bill) was one of the last Mountain Men to inhabit the Salmon River Canyon at 5 Mile Bar. He arrived to the canyon in/around 1928 from the Oklahoma Territory. For nearly 50 years he lived at 5 Mile Bar and spent less than 50 dollars a year on staples like coffee, tea, chocolate, sugar, flour, etc. Buckskin was a true craftsman in his own right forging his own knives, pistols, rifles, kettles, pots, and pans.  Buckskin died in 1980 and his cabin at 5 mile bar has been turned into a museum.

Gold
In the 1860s, placer deposits of gold were found along the river, and a gold rush began. Miners came to the area, causing clashes with the Nez Perce on their ancestral tribal lands. Many historic and present day mines (including dredging operations) can be seen while traveling along the river.

Recreation

Several national forests and Sawtooth National Recreation Area provide for numerous recreation opportunities within the river's watershed. Two segments (the Middle Fork and a section of the main Salmon River, known as the Main Fork) are protected as National Wild and Scenic Rivers. The Middle Fork was one of the original eight rivers designated Wild and Scenic in 1968, and is often considered the "crown jewel" of the Wild and Scenic system.

The Salmon is a popular destination for whitewater kayaking, canoeing, and rafting. The canyons of the Salmon allow for magnificent views of the complex geology of the region. Outdoor Lodges dot the main canyon of the Salmon River from Salmon, Idaho to Riggins, Idaho. Often the only way to access these lodges is either by motorized boats, rafting trips, hiking, and even some isolated airstrips.

Both the Middle Fork and Main Fork travel through the Frank Church-River of No Return Wilderness Area. The Middle Fork raft trip run ends  prior to the beginning of the Main Fork run; Corn Creek is the start of the Main Fork section of the Salmon River.

The South Fork of the Salmon flows through Payette National Forest and enters the Wild and Scenic Main Fork at Mackay Bar. Boating companies offer both single and multiple day trips on the river.

The Middle Fork of the Salmon River is known as one of the best catch and release fly fisheries in the nation. Other recreational activities along the river include camping, hiking and mountain biking.

Wildlife

The Salmon River historically produced 45% percent of all the steelhead (ocean-going rainbow trout) and 45 percent of all the spring and summer chinook salmon in the entire Columbia River Basin.  The Salmon River basin contains most (up to 70 percent) of the remaining salmon and steelhead habitat in the Columbia River Basin. Despite abundant, excellent salmon habitat in the Salmon River basin, chinook, steelhead, and sockeye salmon populations have not significantly recovered, despite listings under the federal Endangered Species Act since the mid-1990s.  Populations remain at risk in large part because of the negative effects of four federal dams and reservoirs on the lower Snake river, through which both juvenile salmon and returning adults must pass.  Many Northwest salmon advocates, commercial & sportfishermen call for removal of the Lower Granite, Little Goose, Lower Monumental, and Ice Harbor dams to address survival problems.  As of November 2015, controversy continues in NW Politics, public discourse, and in federal court, where federal salmon recovery plans are under legal challenge.

USGS stations

The United States Geological Survey operates four stream gauge water level monitoring stations on the main stem of the Salmon River and 17 others on its tributaries. Real time data is available for each station on the USGS website. For a map of these see Salmon River USGS Station Map or in the box at right.

Gallery

See also
List of Idaho rivers
List of longest streams of Idaho
List of National Wild and Scenic Rivers

References

External links

Salmon River  – Salmon River, Info Hub
Visit Idaho.org – Idaho Rivers
Salmon River (National Wild and Scenic Rivers site)
Middle Fork of the Salmon (National Wild and Scenic Rivers site)

Rivers of Idaho
Canyons and gorges of Idaho
Rivers of Idaho County, Idaho
Rivers of Lemhi County, Idaho
Rivers of Custer County, Idaho
Rivers of Blaine County, Idaho
Tributaries of the Snake River
Salmon-Challis National Forest
Sawtooth National Forest
Wild and Scenic Rivers of the United States